The United States Post Office Cooper Station, located at 93 Fourth Avenue, on the corner of East 11th Street in Manhattan, New York City, was built in 1937, and was designed by consulting architect William Dewey Foster in the Art Moderne style for the Office of the Supervising Architect of the United States Department of the Treasury.  It serves the 10003 ZIP code, which covers the neighborhood of the East Village. Its sub-station is located on East 3rd Street near Avenue C.

The post office is named in honor of Peter Cooper, the mid-19th century industrialist and philanthropist who founded the nearby The Cooper Union for the Advancement of Science and Art.

The building was listed on the National Register of Historic Places in 1989.

In popular culture
The fictional character Newman from the television sitcom Seinfeld supposedly worked here.  A photo of this corner building was frequently used as an establishing shot for scenes involving hm.

References

External links

 Map and Business Hours – USPS website
Lombardi, Kristin. "Not Subject to Review" Village Voice (March 7, 2006) – USPS sells air rights for Cooper Station Post Office

Cooper Station
East Village, Manhattan